William Thomas Strand  (1877–1960) was a New Zealand politician. He was Mayor of Lower Hutt on two occasions.

Biography
Strand was a farmer and was chairman of the Hutt River Board. In April 1921 he was elected to the Lower Hutt Borough Council. In December 1921 Strand and the Mayor, Percy Rishworth, disagreed with the erection of a gasworks in Lower Hutt. The public supported a new gasworks in a plebiscite but Strand and the Ratepayers' Association opposed it. Strand made a speech to the Ratepayers' Association accusing Rishworth of a 'breach of faith' which was later leaked and published in newspapers. At the next council meeting Rishworth addressed the matter and challenged Strand to resign along with himself and contest an election for mayor. Strand accepted the challenge and defeated Rishworth in the by-election. He served as mayor until 1929 when he declined to seek re-election. Two years later his successor as mayor, Sir Alex Roberts, also declined to seek another term and Strand was persuaded to stand again, succeeding him unopposed. He retired in 1933.

He was appointed a Member of the Order of the British Empire in the 1957 New Year Honours for his services to local government.

Notes

References

1877 births
1960 deaths
New Zealand farmers
Hutt City Councillors
Mayors of Lower Hutt
New Zealand Members of the Order of the British Empire